Caroline Gleich is an American skier, mountaineer, and environmental activist. She is notable for her advocacy for environmental justice and climate reform.

Biography 
Gleich was born in Minnesota. She and her family moved to the state of Utah at the age of 15, where she developed an interest in skiing. Both of her parents are physicians at the University of Utah. Gleich decided to become an activist during her senior year in college after enrolling in a course on American national government. She is now an advocate for environmental justice and climate reform. Some of her work was cited by Protect Our Winters.

She is a supporter of the American Public Lands and Waters Climate Solution Act of 2019, and testified in front of congress in support of the bill.

In addition to her activism, Gleich is a professional skier and mountaineer. In 2017 she became the first woman and fourth skier to ski all 90 lines of the Chuting Gallery, a series of skiing slopes in the Wasatch Mountains. She summited Mt. Everest with her husband in 2019, in an effort to promote gender equality in sports.

References 

Activists from Utah
American female alpine skiers
American environmentalists
Year of birth missing (living people)
Living people